Granulina lawsonae is a species of very small sea snail, a marine gastropod mollusk or micromollusk in the family Granulinidae.

Description

Distribution

References

Granulinidae
Gastropods described in 1998